Ragnhild Noer (born 28 December 1959) is a Norwegian judge.

She was born in Oslo. She worked as a presiding judge in Borgarting from 2005 to 2010, and as Supreme Court Justice from 2010.

References

Supreme Court of Norway justices
Living people
1959 births
Judges from Oslo
Norwegian women judges